Lafferty is a census-designated place in northeastern Union Township, Belmont County, Ohio, United States, along Wheeling Creek. As of the 2010 census it had a population of 304. It has a post office with the ZIP code 43951.

Lafferty is part of the Wheeling, WV-OH Metropolitan Statistical Area.

The community was named after one Dr. Joseph Laf(f)erty.

Notable person
 Frank John "Skeeter" Scalzi, baseball player

References

Census-designated places in Belmont County, Ohio